Cham Zereshk is a village in Darb-e Gonbad Rural District, Darb-e Gonbad District, Kuhdasht County, Lorestan Province, Iran. At the 2006 census, its population was 135, in 21 families.

References 

Towns and villages in Kuhdasht County